Robina Sentongo (died 18 December 2020) was a Ugandan politician.

Biography
She was a Member of the Parliament of Uganda from 2016 until her death in December 2020. Sentongo died from COVID-19 st age 58.

References

1960s births
2020 deaths
Members of the Parliament of Uganda
Deaths from the COVID-19 pandemic in Uganda